The Ak-Suu or Aqsu (Aqsū, both meaning "white water") is a river running through mostly Moskva District, Chüy Region, Kyrgyzstan and Shu District, Jambyl Region, Kazakhstan. It takes its rise on the northern slope of the Kyrgyz Ala-Too, and it runs through the Narzan Valley north into the Chüy Valley and through the city of Belovodskoye, which is named after it. It flows into the Chu (left tributary) in southern Kazakhstan.

References

Rivers of Kyrgyzstan
Rivers of Kazakhstan
International rivers of Asia
Tian Shan